James Lindenberg (December 20, 1921 – April 28, 2009) was an American-born Filipino engineer and businessman. He moved to the Philippines in the 1940s.  He is credited for his founding of Bolinao Electronics Corporation (BEC), the precursor of ABS-CBN Corporation, and dubbed as the Father of Philippine Television.

References

See also
ABS-CBN Corporation

1921 births
2009 deaths
American television company founders
ABS-CBN executives
Filipino television company founders
American emigrants to the Philippines